Haftka or Hafftka is a Polish and Jewish family name of Polish origin. The Polish word literally means "hook-and-eye". Notable people with this surname include:

Aleksander Hafftka (1892–1964), Polish Jewish historian and statesman
Michael Hafftka, American figurative expressionist painter
Raphael Haftka (1944–2020), American engineer, Distinguished Professor at University of Florida
Stefan Haftka, Swiss sailing sportsman

Polish-language surnames
Jewish surnames